The 31st Robert Awards ceremony was held on 26 February 2014 in Copenhagen, Denmark. Organized by the Danish Film Academy, the awards honoured the best in Danish and foreign film of 2013.

Honorees

Best Danish Film 
 The Hunt

Best Children's Film 
  – Ask Hasselbalch

Best Director 
 Thomas Vinterberg – The Hunt

Best Screenplay 
 Thomas Vinterberg and Tobias Lindholm – The Hunt

Best Actor in a Leading Role 
 Mads Mikkelsen – The Hunt

Best Actress in a Leading Role 
 Helle Fagralid – Sorrow and Joy

Best Actor in a Supporting Role 
 Nicolas Bro –

Best Actress in a Supporting Role 
 Susse Wold – The Hunt

Best Production Design 
 Thomas Greve –

Best Cinematography 
 Larry Smith – Only God Forgives

Best Costume Design 
 Manon Rasmussen –

Best Makeup 
 Thomas Foldberg, Morten Jacobsen, and Lone Bidstrup Knudsen –

Best Editing 
 Anne Østerud and  - The Hunt

Best Sound Design 
 Kristian Eidnes Andersen – Only God Forgives

Best Score 
 Cliff Martinez – Only God Forgives

Best Visual Effects 
 Hummer Højmark, Rikke Gjerløv Hansen, Thomas Øhlenschlæger, and Jeppe Nygaard Christensen –

Best Short Fiction/Animation 
 2 Piger 1 Kage – Jens Dahl

Best Long Fiction/Animation 
 Weekendfar – Johan Stahl Winthereik

Best Documentary Short 
 Tal R: The Virgin – Daniel Dencik

Best Documentary Feature 
 Drømmen om en Familie – Mira Jargil

Best Short Television Series 
 Rytteriet II

Best Danish Television Series 
 Borgen III – Charlotte Sieling

Best Actress in a Leading Television Role 
 Sofia Helin – Broen II

Best Actor in a Leading Television Role 
 Kim Bodnia – Broen II

Best Actress in a Supporting Television Role 
 Camilla Bendix – Broen II

Best Actor in a Supporting Television Role 
 Christian Tafdrup – Borgen III

Best American Film 
 Gravity 3D – Alfonso Cuarón

Best Non-American Film 
 Blue Is the Warmest Colour – Abdellatif Kechiche

Audience Award 
 Alle for to – as "YouSee Publikumsprisen – Komedie"
 The Hunt – as "YouSee Publikumsprisen – Drama"

See also 

 2014 Bodil Awards

References

External links 
  

2013 film awards
Robert Awards ceremonies
2014 in Copenhagen
February 2014 events in Europe